Daiana Yasmín Farías Aldacour (born 26 January 1999) is a Uruguayan footballer who plays as a centre back for Spanish Segunda División Pro club Racing and the Uruguay women's national team.

References 

1999 births
Living people
Women's association football central defenders
Women's association football midfielders
Uruguayan women's footballers
Uruguay women's international footballers
Colón F.C. players
Peñarol players
CDE Racing Féminas players
Uruguayan expatriate women's footballers
Uruguayan expatriate sportspeople in Portugal
Expatriate women's footballers in Portugal